This is a list of prominent people who were born in, lived in, or are otherwise closely associated with the United States Virgin Islands (which are composed of the islands of St. Croix, St. John, and St. Thomas). This list does not include people from the British Virgin Islands. The list covers notable individuals who have garnered international recognition in artistic, cultural, economic, historical, notorious, and political arenas.

Actors 

 Lisa Canning (born 1966), television actress
 Kelsey Grammer (born 1955), actor
 Lawrence Hilton-Jacobs (born 1953), actor
 Jasmin St. Claire (born 1970), adult film actress

Artists 
 Fraser Kershaw, philanthropist, film artist
 Fritz Melbye (1826–1869), marine painter; born in Denmark, lived and painted in the Danish West Indies
 Camille Pissarro (1830–1903), artist, French Impressionist painter

Athletes 
 Raja Bell (born 1976), former professional basketball player
 Tombi Bell (born 1979), former professional basketball player (sister to Raja Bell)
 Livingstone Bramble (born 1960 on St. Kitts & Nevis; raised on St. Croix), former professional boxing champion
 Jerry Browne (born 1966), professional baseball player 
 Joe Christopher (born 1935), first baseball player born in the territory to play in Major League Baseball
 Horace Clarke (born 1940), professional baseball player
 Callix Crabbe (born 1983), Major League Baseball Player (San Diego Padres)
 Midre Cummings (born 1971), professional baseball player
 Tim Duncan (born 1976), former professional basketball player for the San Antonio Spurs
 Brasheedah Elohim, American-Israeli women's professional basketball player
 Emile Griffith (1938–2013), professional boxing champion
 Elrod Hendricks (1940–2005), professional baseball player and coach
 Peter Holmberg (born 1960), Olympic sailor; as of 2016, the only member of the USVI Olympic Team to win an Olympic medal
 John Jackson (born 1989), professional boxer (son of Julian Jackson; brother to Julius Jackson)
 Julian Jackson (born 1960), former professional boxing champion
 Julius Jackson (born 1987), professional boxer (son of Julian Jackson)
 Milt Newton, former professional basketball player; administrator for multiple NBA teams
 Calvin Pickering (born 1976), professional baseball player
 "Sugar" Ray Seales (born 1952 in Saint Croix), the only American boxer to win gold in the 1972 Summer Olympics
 LaVerne Jones-Ferrette, professional sprinter and Olympian

Entrepreneurs 
 Sosthenes Behn (1882–1957), founder of the Puerto Rico Telephone Company and ITT Corporation 
 William Leidesdorff, (1810–1848), entrepreneur
 Bartholomew Sharp, (c1650–1702), buccaneer

Historians 
 Arturo Alfonso Schomburg (1874–1938), historian, writer, activist, namesake of the Schomburg Center for Research in Black Culture; born in Puerto Rico to a mother from St. Croix, attended school on St. Thomas

Models 
 Hannah Jeter (born 1990), Sports Illustrated Swimsuit Issue model; born and raised on St. Thomas

Musicians 
 Alton Adams (1889–1987), musician, first black bandmaster in the United States Navy
 Bennie Benjamin (1907–1989), composer
 Delyno Brown, reggae artist
 Vanessa Daou, international singer-songwriter, dancer, writer, poet
 Jon Lucien (1942–2007), vocalist and musician; born on the island of Tortola and raised on Saint Thomas
 Rock City, musical duo also known as R. City and Planet VI; formed 2003 in St. Thomas, U.S. Virgin Islands
 Theron Thomas, member of musical duo Rock City

Nurses 
 Ianthe Blyden (1899–1984), pioneer of nursing at Knud Hansen Memorial Hospital on St. Thomas
 Myrah Keating Smith (1908–1994), the only health provider on St. John for two decades

Pharmacist 

 Albert Heinrich Riise (1810 – 1882), often referred to as A. H. Riise, was a Danish pharmacist and Rum manufacturer from St. Thomas in the Danish West Indies.

Political leaders 

 Alexander Hamilton (1755–1804), first United States Secretary of the Treasury, an American "founding father", economist, and political philosopher; born in Nevis, raised on St. Croix
 Archie Alexander (1888–1958), mathematician, engineer, former Governor of the Virgin Islands
 Judah P. Benjamin (1811–1884), first Jewish U.S. Senator; Secretary of State, Confederate States of America
 Edward Wilmot Blyden (1832–1912), Liberian educator, writer, diplomat, and politician
 Frank Rudolph Crosswaith (1892–1965), socialist and labor leader
Gabriel Milan governor from 7 May 1684 to 27 February 1686
Ron De Lugo, St. Croix politician and former candidate for governor
 Hubert Henry Harrison (1883–1927), orator, political activist
 William H. Hastie (1904–1976), jurist, lawyer, Governor of the Virgin Islands
Ulises Heureaux (1845–1899), former President of the Dominican Republic (mother born in Saint Thomas)
 Casper Holstein (1888–1944), humanitarian
 Roy Innis (born 1934), African-American activist, civil rights leader
 D. Hamilton Jackson (1884–1946), journalist, labor leader, attorney, judge
 J. Raymond Jones (1899–1991), political leader, humanitarian
 William Leidesdorff (1810–1848), entrepreneur
 Juan Francisco Luis (1940–2011), 24th Governor of the U.S. Virgin Islands
 Antonio López de Santa Anna (1794–1876), President of Mexico
 Terence Todman (1926–2014), former U.S. ambassador
 Denmark Vesey (1767–1822), slave revolt leader
 Peter Carl Frederik von Scholten (1784–1854), Governor-General of the Danish West Indies from 1827 to 1848

Writers 
 Barbara Christian (1943–2000), educator and writer
 Doris Jadan (1925–2004), author and environmental activist; lived on St. John from 1955 until her death
 Audre Lorde (1934–1992), writer, feminist, civil rights activist; born in New York, died on St. Croix
 Karrine Steffans (born 1978), author
 Tiphanie Yanique (born 1978), author; born and raised on St. Thomas

See also
List of Eastern Caribbean people
Virgin Islands American

References

External links
 University of the Virgin Islands: Profiles of outstanding Virgin Islanders (1972)
 Media Library Services, Department of Education, St. Croix District: Profiles of Outstanding Virgin Islanders

 
Virgin Islanders
People
United States Virgin Islands